Ivana is a feminine given name of Slavic origin that is also popular in southern Ireland, France, French-speaking Canada, the Mediterranean and Latin America. It is the feminine form of the name Ivan, which are both the Slavic cognates of the names Joanna and John. It may also be spelled as Ivanna.

In Croatia, the name Ivana was the most common feminine given name between 1970 and 1999.

Variants Iva and Ivanka are diminutives derived from Ivana. The name day is celebrated on April 4. In Croatia, the name day is celebrated on December 27. In Slovakia, the name day is celebrated on December 28. In Macedonia, the name day is celebrated on July 07 - also known as Ivanden.

People named Ivana

Given name

Ivana

 Ivana (singer) (born 1969), Bulgarian pop-folk singer
 Ivana Abramović (born 1983), Croatian professional tennis player
 Ivana Alawi (born 1996) Filipina actress, model, YouTuber and singer
 Ivana Bacik (born 1968), Czech-Irish politician
 Ivana Banfić (born 1969), Croatian dancer and pop singer
 Ivana Baquero (born 1994), Spanish actress
 Ivana Bojdová (born 1985), Slovak female footballer
 Ivana Brkljačić (born 1983), Croatian hammer thrower
 Ivana Brlić-Mažuranić (1874–1938), Croatian writer
 Ivana Dežić (born 1994), Croatian handball player
 Ivana Dlhopolčeková (born 1986), Slovak ice dancer
 Ivana Dulić-Marković (born 1961), Serbian politician
 Ivana Đerisilo (born 1983), Serbian volleyball player
 Ivana Hong (born 1992), American gymnast
 Ivana Hudziecová (born 1985), Czech figure skater
 Ivana Isailović (born 1986), Serbian volleyball player
 Ivana Janečková (born 1984), Czech cross country skier
 Ivana Jirešová (born 1977), Czech actress
 Ivana Kapitanović (born 1994), Croatian handball player
 Ivana Kindl (born 1978), Croatian singer
 Ivana Kiš (born 1979), Croatian composer
 Ivana Kobilca (1861–1926), Slovenian realist painter
 Ivana Kubešová (born 1962), Czech athlete
 Ivana Lie (b. 1960), Indonesian badminton player
 Ivana Lisjak (born 1987), Croatian professional tennis player
 Ivana Lovrić (born 1984), Croatian handball player
 Ivana Loudová (1941–2017), Czech composer
 Ivana Luković (born 1992), Serbian volleyball player
 Ivana Maksimović (born 1990), Serbian sport shooter
 Ivana Maletić (born 1973), Croatian politician
 Ivana Matović (born 1983), Serbian basketball player
 Ivana Miličević (born 1974), American actress
 Ivana Miloš (born 1986), Croatian volleyball player
 Ivana Mišura (born 1989), Croatian model
 Ivana Nešović (born 1988), Serbian volleyball player
 Ivana Peters (born 1974), Serbian singer
 Ivana Reitmayerová (born 1992), Slovak figure skater
 Ivana Santilli, Canadian singer and multi-instrumentalist
 Ivana Selakov (born 1978), Serbian singer
 Ivana Spagna (born 1954), Italian singer and songwriter
 Ivana Tipton, London Tipton's Dog
 Ivana Tomljenović-Meller (1906–1988), Croatian graphic designer, photographer and art teacher.
 Ivana Trump (1949–2022), Czech-American socialite, fashion model, and athlete
 Ivanka Trump, (born 1981 as Ivana Trump), American businesswoman, fashion designer, author, and reality television personality. Daughter of Ivana and Donald Trump.
 Ivana Večeřová (born 1979), Czech basketball player
 Ivana Vuleta (born 1990), Serbian long-jumper
 Ivana Wong (born 1979), Hong Kong cantopop singer

Ivanna

 Ivanna Borovychenko (born 1990) Ukrainian cyclist
 Ivanna S. Pankin (born 1989) U.S. roller derby skater
 Ivanna Israilova (born 1986) Russian-Uzbek tennis player
 Ivanna Klympush-Tsintsadze (born 1972) Ukrainian politician
 Ivanna Madruga (born 1971) Argentine tennis player
 Ivanna Sakhno (born 1997) Ukrainian actress
 Ivanna Vale (born 1992) Venezuelan model

Ivanka

 Ivanka Bonova (born 1949) Bulgarian sprinter
 Ivanka Khristova (born 1941) Bulgarian shot-putter
 Ivanka Koleva (born 1968) Bulgarian Paralympian
 Ivanka Matić (born 1979) Serbian basketball player
 Ivanka Moralieva (born 1983) Bulgarian swimmer
 Ivanka Muerova, Bulgarian sprint canoer
 Ivanka Ninova, Bulgarian opera singer
 Ivanka Petrova (born 1951) Bulgarian shot-putter
 Ivanka Raspopović (born 1930), Serbian architect
 Ivana "Ivanka" Trump (born 1981), daughter of Donald Trump
 Ivanka Valkova (born 1949) Bulgarian sprinter
 Ivanka Vancheva (born 1953) Bulgarian javelin thrower
 Ivanka Venkova (born 1952) Bulgarian sprinter

Iva

Surname
Milan Ivana, Slovak footballer
Mária Ivánka (born 1950), Hungarian chess player

Other uses
 Ivanka (horse) (born 1990) racehorse
 Ivana Baiul, fictional character in the comic books  DV8 and Gen¹³

See also
 Ivan (name)

References

Croatian feminine given names
Czech feminine given names
Macedonian feminine given names
Serbian feminine given names
Slovak feminine given names